Seli or Kato Vermio is a village and winter sports resort in Greece.

Seli may also refer to:
Places in Estonia
Seli, Pärnu County, village in Lääneranna Parish, Pärnu County, Estonia
Seli, Rae Parish, village in Rae Parish, Harju County, Estonia
Seli, Rapla County, village in Rapla Parish, Rapla County, Estonia
Seli, Tallinn, subdistrict of Tallinn, Estonia
Seliküla, village in Järva Parish, Järva County

Places in Latvia
Sēļi parish, former municipality of Valmiera District

People with the surname
Neinar Seli (born 1959), Estonian businessman and politician